After the Wedding is a 1962 Soviet drama film directed by Mikhail Yershov.

Plot 
A young guy from Leningrad is getting married and after the wedding he goes on duty to the village. After some time he is allowed to return, but he decides to stay in the village, because he understands that the collective farm needs him.

Cast 
 Stanislav Khitrov as Igor Malyutin
 Natalya Kustinskaya as Tonya Malyutina
 Aleftina Konstantinova as Vera
 Leonard Borisevich as Aleksey Ivanovich Ippolitov
 Pavel Kashlakov as Genka
 Yury Solovyov as Semyon
 Georgy Satini as Yuriy Pavlovich Pisarev
 Vera Titova as Nadezhda Osipovna
 Yevgeniy Teterin as Vitaliy Fadeyevich Chernyshyov
 YeBoris Kokovkin as Kislov

References

External links 
 

1962 films
1960s Russian-language films
Soviet drama films
1962 drama films